K.H.N. Kuranga is an Indian Advocate who is served as the Chief Justice of Chhattisgarh High Court and judge of Karnataka High Court.

Career 
He was appointed as Advocate on 17 May 1968 and then he became Judge of Karnataka High Court on 22 February 1993 to February 2002. On 6 February 2002 he became second Chief Justice of Chhattisgarh High Court. He served in this role until May 2004.

References 

Living people
Chief Justices of the Karnataka High Court
Chief Justices of Chhattisgarh High Court
Year of birth missing (living people)